Fábio Samuel Amorim Silva (born 21 April 1996), known as Samu, is a Portuguese professional footballer who plays for F.C. Vizela as a midfielder.

Club career

Boavista
Samu was born in Mozelos (Santa Maria da Feira), Aveiro District. He joined Boavista FC's youth system at the age of 14, from FC Porto.

Samu totalled just ten Primeira Liga appearances for the club over two and a half seasons, his first being a 1–0 away loss against C.F. União on 6 January 2016 where he came on as a 76th-minute substitute for Idrissa Mandiang. During this timeframe, he was also loaned to AD Fafe (LigaPro) and S.C. Espinho (third division).

Vizela
In July 2019, Samu signed with F.C. Vizela of the third tier. He helped the team to two consecutive promotions in two years, notably scoring eight goals – with eight assists – in the 2020–21 campaign.

Samu renewed his contract on 9 July 2021, with the new deal running until 2024. He scored his first goal in the Portuguese top flight on 6 November, in a 1–1 home draw with G.D. Estoril Praia. The following 6 February, his brace earned his side one point following a 2–2 draw at his first club as a senior.

International career
Samu represented Portugal at under-19 level.

References

External links

1996 births
Living people
Sportspeople from Santa Maria da Feira
Portuguese footballers
Association football midfielders
Primeira Liga players
Liga Portugal 2 players
Campeonato de Portugal (league) players
Boavista F.C. players
AD Fafe players
S.C. Espinho players
F.C. Vizela players
Portugal youth international footballers